Watch Them Fall is the debut album by the American singer-songwriter Katie Herzig, released in 2004. The song Watch Them Fall was featured in the TV series Smallville and Say Goodbye appeared on the film X's & O's.

Track list

References 

2004 debut albums
Katie Herzig albums